This is a complete list of chapters for the three manga series released for Blood+. Blood+ is a fifty-episode anime series produced by Production I.G and Aniplex that originally aired in Japan from October 8, 2005 through September 23, 2006. To lead up the premiere of the series, Production I.G commissioned the creation of three different manga series to tie into the anime. The first manga series, also titled Blood+, and written by Asuka Katsura, is a five-volume series that first premiered in Beans Ace Magazine in July 2005. It covers the same story events as the anime series. Blood+: Adagio was written by Kumiko Suekane. It is a two-volume series that premiered in the September 2005 issue of Shōnen Ace and follows Saya and Hagi's experiences during the Russian Revolution. It premiered in the September issue of Asuka Ciel. Set in Shanghai, it follows Hagi as he searches for Saya and the complications he must deal with. Unlike the other Blood+ manga adaptations, which are seinen and shōnen works respectively, Blood+: Kowloon Nights is a shōjo manga, particularly of the shōnen-ai (or Boy's Love) genre.

For all three series, the tankōbon volumes were published by Kadokawa Shoten. All three manga adaptations have been licensed for an English language release in North America by Dark Horse Comics.

Volumes

Blood+

Blood+: Adagio

Blood+: Kowloon Nights

Notes

References

Blood+
Blood: The Last Vampire